Conocramboides is a monotypic moth genus of the family Crambidae described by Stanisław Błeszyński in 1970. Its only species, Conocramboides seychellellus, described by Thomas Bainbrigge Fletcher in 1910, is found in the Seychelles, Réunion and in Mauritius.

Subspecies
 Conocramboides seychellellus seychellellus from Seychelles
 Conocramboides seychellellus emmerezellus (de Joannis, 1915) from La Réunion and Mauritius

Ecology
Food plants of the larvae of this species are Poaceae (Cynodon dactylon, Axonopus compressus, Digitaria didactyla, Zoysia matrella and Cynodon dactylon)

References
Fletcher 1910. "Lepidoptera exclusive of the Tortricidae and Tineidae, with some remarks on their distribution and means of dispersal among the islands of the Indian Ocean". (The Percy Sladen Trust Expedition to the Indian Ocean in 1905). Transactions of the Linnean Society of London (2)Zool. 13(1):265–324; plate 17

External links
 Lépidoptères de La Réunion: picture of Conocramboides seychellellus

Crambinae
Crambidae genera
Moths of Africa
Monotypic moth genera
Taxa named by Stanisław Błeszyński